Ivol Ira Curtis was a bishop of the Episcopal Diocese of Olympia.

See also 
List of bishops of the Episcopal Church in the United States of America

References

1994 deaths
Episcopal bishops of Los Angeles
Episcopal bishops of Olympia